Ab Owen may refer to:

 David ab Owen (died 1512), Welsh abbot, and bishop of St Asaph
 Dafydd ap Ieuan ab Owen, 16th-century Welsh poet
 Thomas ab Owen, 16th-century member of parliament for Haverfordwest
 Lewis ab Owen (died 1555), member of parliament for Merioneth
 Lewis ab Owen ap Meurig (died 1590), member of parliament for Anglesey
 Ifan ab Owen Edwards (1895–1970), founder of Urdd Gobaith Cymru
 Rhys ab Owen, member of the Senedd for the South Wales Central region

See also
 Ab Owain
 Bowen (surname)
 Bowens (surname)
 Bown
 Bowne
 Bownes
 Owen (name)
 Owens (surname)

Surnames of Welsh origin